Glyphodes quadrifascialis is a moth in the family Crambidae. It was described by George Hampson in 1899. It is found in the Republic of the Congo, the Democratic Republic of the Congo and Ghana.

References

Moths described in 1899
Glyphodes